The women's kata competition in karate at the 2001 World Games took place on 19 August 2001 at the Tenno Town Gymnasium in Tenno, Akita, Japan.

Competition format
A total of 9 athletes entered the competition. They fought in cup system with repechages.

Results

Gold medal bracket

Bronze medal bracket

References

External links
 Results on IWGA website

Karate at the 2001 World Games